Priya Raman (born 18 June 1974) is an Indian actress and television producer. She has appeared in Malayalam, Tamil, Telugu and Kannada cinema and in television serials of Malayalam and Tamil languages. Her first film was the Rajnikanth-produced film Valli, in 1993. Her second film, Arthana, directed by I. V. Sasi and released in 1993, was her debut in Malayalam film industry.

Film career
Malayalam director Joshiy cast her as an airforce pilot in 1993 in Sainyam with Mammootty.

Besides films, she has also appeared in a number of Tamil and Malayalam television serials like the Tamil serial Durga, Malayalam T.V serial Kavyanjali produced by of Balaji Telefilms (as "Anjali"), Swarnamayooram, Pavakoothu and Orma (as "Girly"). She have acted in Zee Tamil serial, Sembaruthi. She also hosts a celebrity reality game show called Genes in the same channel.

Filmography

Film

TV serials

Other shows

Web series

Award and nominations

Cinema Express Awards Best Newface Actress -Valli 
Zee Tamil Family Awards

2018 -Won - Most Popular Mom - Sembaruthi

2019 -Nominated - Best Anchor - Genes Season 3

2020-Won- Best Anchor - Genes Season 3
2020- Nominated - Most Popular Mom- Sembaruthi
2020- Nominated- Most Popular Mamiyar- Sembaruthi

References

External links
 

Actresses in Tamil cinema
Actresses in Malayalam cinema
Living people
Actresses from Kochi
20th-century Indian actresses
People from Aluva
Malayalam film producers
Indian women film producers
Film producers from Kochi
Indian film actresses
Actresses in Tamil television
Actresses in Telugu television
Indian television actresses
Actresses in Malayalam television
21st-century Indian actresses
Businesswomen from Kerala
Actresses in Telugu cinema
Actresses in Kannada cinema
Actresses in Hindi cinema
1974 births